Peroutka (Czech feminine: Peroutková) is a Czech surname. Notable people with the surname include:

 Ferdinand Peroutka (1895–1978), Czech journalist and writer
 Michael Peroutka (born 1952), American politician

Czech-language surnames